Marcin Matkowski and Aisam-ul-Haq Qureshi were the defending champions, but lost in the quarterfinals to Raven Klaasen and Michael Venus.

Oliver Marach and Mate Pavić won the title, defeating Max Mirnyi and Philipp Oswald in the final, 6–4, 5–7, [10–7].

Seeds

Draw

Draw

References
 Main Draw

ASB Classic - Men's Doubles
2018 Doubles
ASB